Sungkyunkwan University Station (Station P153) is a ground-level metro station on line 1 of the Seoul Subway in Yuljeon Dong, Jangan Gu, Suwon, South Korea. The station's sole exit offers access to Sungkyunkwan University and Dongnam Health College.  Travel time from Sungkyunkwan University Station to Seoul Station on Line 1 is 54 minutes, and travelling to Sungkyunkwan University's other campus, by Hyehwa Station in Seoul, takes 67 minutes, transferring to Line 4 at Geumjeong.
Extension work recently set on Sungkyunkwan university station with 4 floors including café and community center that can handle more than 50,000 people a day and this construction will be finished at the end of 2016.

History
Sungkyunkwan University Station opened on February 1, 1979, under the name of Yuljeon Station (율전역/), a name taken from the dong in which it is located.  Five years later, on January 1, 1984, it was renamed Seongdae-ap Station (성대앞역/앞), taking its name as an abbreviated form of the nearby Sungkyunkwan University campus.  It was only on December 1, 1994 that it took its current full name of Sungkyunkwan University Station.  In 2008, Suwon City Council operated a 20-day public consultation on changing the name of the station once again.  It had three suggestions, being a return to the name Yuljeon Station (율전역/), Yuljeon Station (Sungkyunkwan University Station) (율전역(성균관대역)/()) and Sungkyunkwan University Station (Yuljeon Station) (성균관대역(율전역)/()), though it was also possible for the public to suggest alternative names.  At the end of this consultation period, no change was made.

Services
The first train of the day weekdays (not including national holidays) is at 5.18 a.m. northbound and 5.33 a.m. southbound, while the last is at 11.57 p.m. northbound and 12.18 a.m. southbound. Northbound trains have various destinations. The express train bound for Cheongnyangni station and Cheonan station / Sinchang station stops at the station.

Photos

References

Metro stations in Suwon
Seoul Metropolitan Subway stations
Railway stations opened in 1979